The canton of Montsinéry-Tonnegrande (French: Canton de Montsinéry-Tonnegrande) is one of the former cantons of the Guyane department in French Guiana. It was located in the arrondissement of Cayenne. Its administrative seat was located in Montsinéry-Tonnegrande, the canton's sole commune. Its population was 2,483 in 2012.

Administration

References 

Montsinéry-Tonnegrande